LR Health & Beauty Systems GmbH was founded in 1985 by Helmut Spikker and Achim Hickmann in Ahlen, Germany, as LR Cosmetic & Marketing GmbH and is considered a leading European direct selling company in the health and beauty products sector.

Products 
Following the motto "More quality for your life", the LR Group produces and markets various health and beauty products. The company's product range includes nutritional supplements, cosmetic care series, perfume as well as accessories. According to the annual report as of 31 December 2008, the production of the company's own cosmetic and care products takes place exclusively at the Ahlen site; food supplements are manufactured and filled by external suppliers. Decorative cosmetics and accessories are imported as trade goods mainly from Southeast Asia. On 16 October 2013, LR opened a new research and development centre for food supplements and dietary products in Ahlen with a size of 320 square metres, this was followed in 2018 by the opening of a 4,000 square metre production facility for aloe vera products.

Business 
According to own statements, the turnover of LR Health & Beauty Systems developed from €0.4 million in 1985, €120 million in 1994 to €325 million in 2006. In 2009, LR Health & Beauty Systems achieved total sales of €153.1 million, compared to €139.3 million in the previous year, according to the annual financial statements as of 31 December 2009 published in the electronic Bundesanzeiger. Approximately 73 percent of this was achieved in Germany. LR Health & Beauty Systems is active worldwide with a total of 28 international sales companies. In 2011, LR turned over a total of €230 million in all its markets; in the first half of 2012, turnover had risen by five percent.
In 2014, LR generated a turnover of €228 million. According to LR, the main growth drivers for the 15% increase in turnover in 2016 were international markets such as Turkey, Italy, Poland, Belgium, the Netherlands and Spain, but the German market also grew well.
In 2016, LR announced investments of approximately €10 million in a new production facility, the construction started in February 2017. It was inaugurated in Ahlen on 9 February 2018. According to the company, about 12,000 tons of aloe vera leaves are processed there annually and the so-called aloe vera drinking gels are produced.

LR employs a total of 1,213 people worldwide (12/2021). In 2021, the turnover was €296 million.

In June 2011, the cosmetics, health and body care company launched its business in Russia. The product range of LR Health & Beauty Systems GmbH is distributed there via the Moscow and St. Petersburg locations. In September 2012, LR also started business in Kazakhstan.

LR Health & Beauty Systems was owned by the US private equity company Apax Partners, which took a minority stake at the end of 2004 and held the majority from 2009. As of 2013, LR was part of the portfolio of the investment companies Quadriga Capital and Bregal Capital. Since summer 2018, LR has been 100% owned by Quadriga Capital.

LR is a member of the following associations, among others: Direct Selling Europe (dse), Food Supplement Europe and International Aloe Science Council (IASC).

Sales channels 
Product distribution is carried out through so-called network marketing, which is also known as multilevel marketing. According to company information, about 300,000 independent LR partners are connected to the distribution system. However, only a small number of them act as distributors, while the majority only buy the products for their own use.

LR Global Kids Fund 
LR Health & Beauty Systems GmbH has been involved in charity work worldwide since January 2009 with the specially founded children's aid organisation LR Global Kids Fund e. V.. The organisation celebrated its 10th anniversary in 2019 and has so far raised more than four million euros in donations. Among other things, it supports charity projects such as children's homes with the sale of charity products such as 
the "Christmas mug". In Ahlen, the RTL-Kinderhaus Lunch Club children's facility was opened, whose activities the employees can support as part of the "Hands on" programme; they are released from work for this assignment.

Sponsoring 
After company founder Helmut Spikker took over the almost bankrupt football club TuS Ahlen, it renamed itself LR Ahlen (Leichtathletik Rasensport Ahlen e. V.). LR Health & Beauty Systems became the main sponsor at the same time and the new club logo was strongly reminiscent of the LR company logo. The LR Ahlen club existed between 1996 and 2006, during which time LR Ahlen played six seasons in the 2. Bundesliga. After relegation in the Bundesliga Season 2005/06, Spikker withdrew as club president and LR Health & Beauty Systems as sponsor. The club was later renamed Rot Weiss Ahlen.

Controversy 

Like comparable companies that also work on the basis of structural distribution, LR Health & Beauty Systems GmbH is also criticised for selling diet and nutritional supplement products without proven effectiveness at unreasonably high prices.

External links 

 Official website
 Corporate website, Financial information

References 

German brands
Companies based in North Rhine-Westphalia
German companies established in 1985